Lollypop is a platform game published in 1994 by Softgold Computerspiele GmbH on a CD for the MS-DOS format, and was later released for the Amiga in 1995 by Rainbow Arts. It was developed by Brain Bug with the music provided by Vibrants.

Reception 
The game received mixed reviews. Amiga Joker magazine gave it 75% score, while PC Player gave it passable 61%.

References

External links 

 Lollypop at MobyGames
 Lollypop at Internet Archive
 Lollypop cheats at GameSpot

1994 video games
Amiga games
DOS games
Fictional dolls and dummies
Platform games
Sentient toys in fiction
Video games about food and drink
Video games about toys
Video games developed in Germany
Video games featuring female protagonists
Rainbow Arts games
Single-player video games
Ziggurat Interactive games